Valle Salimbene is a comune (municipality) in the Province of Pavia in the Italian region Lombardy, located about 35 km south of Milan and about 7 km southeast of Pavia. As of 31 December 2004, it had a population of 1,368 and an area of 7.1 km².

Valle Salimbene borders the following municipalities: Albuzzano, Cura Carpignano, Linarolo, Pavia, Travacò Siccomario.

Demographic evolution

References

Cities and towns in Lombardy